The 2019 Washington Huskies men's soccer team represented the University of Washington during the 2019 NCAA Division I men's soccer season and the 2019 Pac-12 Conference men's soccer season. It was the program's 57th season fielding a men's varsity soccer team, and their 20th season in the Pac-12 Conference. The 2019 season was Jamie Clark's ninth year as head coach for the program. The regular season began on August 30 and concluded on November 16, with the Huskies winning the 2019 Pac-12 Championship. The conference title has been the third for Washington and its first since 2013. The team had entered the NCAA Tournament as the No. 6 seed and lost to the eventual national champions Georgetown in quarterfinals.

Background 
The Huskies finished the 2018 season with a 12–7–1 overall record and a 6–4 record in Pac-12 play, good enough for a third place finish in the conference. Despite not winning the Pac-12 title, the Huskies earned an at-large berth into the 2018 NCAA Division I Men's Soccer Tournament. Washington hosted Lipscomb University in the first round, where they tied 0–0 in regulation before losing 4–5 on penalty kicks. Scott Menzies lead Washington with 7 goals across all competitions.

Player movement

Departures

2019 MLS Draft

Recruits

Roster

Preseason

Preseason Pac-12 poll
Washington was predicted to finish second in the Pac-12 Conference.

Pre-season All-Pac-12 selections

Schedule 

|-
!colspan=6 style=""| Preseason
|-

|-
!colspan=6 style=""| Non-conference regular season
|-

|-
!colspan=6 style=""| Pac-12 regular season
|-

|-
!colspan=6 style=""| NCAA Tournament
|-

Rankings

Statistics

Appearances and goals

References 

2019
Washington Huskies
Washington Huskies
Washington Huskies men's soccer
Washington Huskies